Tender Is the Savage is the third album released by the Norwegian band Gluecifer. It was originally released in 2000 on White Jazz Records. The album was re-released with extra tracks later that year.

Critical reception
The Austin Chronicle called the album "a sleazy, raucous, brash, and unapologetically paint-by-numbers take on AC/DC." AllMusic wrote that "the potential cheese is made up for by [Gluecifer's] high-energy, guitar-based roots of when 'sex and drugs' were synonymous with the rock star lifestyle." Exclaim! wrote that "if you're too young to remember bands like Junkyard ,and just want to hear some basic hard rock with no postmodern twists or surprises, then Tender is the Savage could be your new car cruisin', joint smokin' record of choice." CMJ New Music Monthly called it a "perfect album."

Original track listing
"I Got a War" - 3:28
"Chewin' Fingers" - 2:22
"Ducktail Heat" - 2:41
"The General Says Hell Yeah" - 3:48
"Red Noses, Shit Poses" - 4:11
"Drunk and Pompous" - 3:21
"Rip-Off Strasse" - 4:16
"Dog Day, Dog Night" - 2:52
"Sputnik Monroe" - 2:57
"Exit at Gate Zero" - 4:16

Revised track listing 
"I Got A War"
"Chewin' Fingers"
"Ducktail Heat"
"The General Says Hell Yeah"
"Red Noses, Shit Poses"
"Drunk And Pompous"
"Rip-Off Strasse"
"Dog Day, Dog Night"
"Sputnik Monroe"
"Exit At Gate Xero"
"Thunder And Lightning"
"Wham Bam Thank You Mam"
"Get That Psycho Out Of My Face"

References

2000 albums
Gluecifer albums
Albums produced by Daniel Rey